Road Between is the debut studio album by American singer Lucy Hale. The album was released on June 3, 2014 by Hollywood Records and DMG Nashville.

Background
On June 12, 2012, Hale announced she had signed a record deal with Hollywood Records (co-partnership with DMG Nashville). The album is a country
album, when was recorded through late 2012 and mid 2013, during Hale's schedule filming her television series Pretty Little Liars. On March 31, 2014, Road Between was unveiled due to a fan contest to reveal the album's cover art. A web series titled The Road Between with Lucy Hale, which consisted of four episodes, released from July 25 to August 6, 2014, on the CMT website. It follows the journey of Hale, visiting her hometown of Memphis, Tennessee and on set with the filming of the music video for the song "Lie a Little Better". In 2016, New Zealand singer-songwriter Kaylee Bell released a cover of album track "That's What I Call Crazy" as a standalone single.

Singles
The lead single "You Sound Good to Me" was released on January 7, 2014. A music video was directed by Philip Andelman, is about Hale going on a road trip with her friends and arriving at a late-night bonfire.

The second and final single, "Lie a Little Better" was released on July 21, 2014. Hale explained the song is about her love crush with actor Drew Van Acker. It debuted at No. 60 on the Billboard Country Airplay chart for the week ending on July 30, 2014.

Cancelled tour
In December 2014, Hale was originally set to embark on The Road Between Tour in spring 2015, to promote the album. However, she later announced the tour was cancelled shortly before it was slated to begin citing vocal issues as the reason.

Critical reception

Road Between was met with mostly positive reception from music critics. At AllMusic, Stephen Thomas Erlewine rated the album three-and-a-half stars out of five, remarking how the music on the release "is irrepressibly charming commercial pop" that "is better when it's lighter", and the music sounds like "pristine pop, thanks in large part to Hale's crisp, chipper delivery." Mike Ayers of Billboard rated the album an 83 out of 100, indicating how the release "is filled with powerful, catchy choruses and moments that display Hale's voice in many different ways." At Roughstock, Matt Bjorke rated the album three-and-a-half stars out of five, writing how the music on the release is not going to be everyone's cup-of-tea, yet it evidences her potential in country music because according to him that is "where she's always wanted to be." Bob Paxman of Country Weekly graded the album a C+, noting how some songs don't work out well for her voice and "Like most contemporary records, the production sounds overly busy and much too polished, stripping away all semblance of real emotion." Yet, Paxman says "for the target audience, namely young females, Lucy and her material should resonate and find its target", but eventually "she may be able to reach a broader base, because the potential is definitely there."

Track listing

Personnel
 Tom Bukovac – electric guitar
 Eric Darken – percussion
 Shannon Forrest – drums
 Paul Franklin – steel guitar
 Aubrey Haynie – fiddle
 Mike Johnson – steel guitar
 Charlie Judge – keyboards
 Chris McHugh – drums
 Jerry McPherson – electric guitar, slide guitar
 Jimmy Nichols – keyboards
 F. Reid Shippen – percussion
 Jimmie Lee Sloas – bass
 Ilya Toshinsky – acoustic guitar, ukulele, mandolin
 Jonathan Yudkin – fiddle, mandolin, cello

Backing vocals
 Robert Bailey
 Sarah Buxton
 Perry Coleman
 Mike Daly
 Fancy Hagood
 Vicki Hampton
 Wes Hightower
 Kim Keyes
 Gene Miller
 Rachel Reinert
 Lucie Silvas
 Jenifer Wrinkle

Charts
The album debuted on the Billboard 200 at No. 14 and No. 4 on the Top Country Albums chart with 18,000 copies sold in the US during its first week. The album has sold 44,000 copies in the US as of August 2014.

Release history

References

2014 debut albums
Lucy Hale albums
Hollywood Records albums
Albums produced by Mark Bright (record producer)